is a Japanese politician of the Liberal Democratic Party, was a member of the House of Representatives in the Diet (national legislature) until 2009. A native of Minamiamabe District, Ōita, she attended Beppu University as an undergraduate and received a master's degree from Takushoku University. She was elected to the House of Representatives for the first time in 2005 after running unsuccessfully for the House of Councillors in the Diet in 2003.

See also 
　Koizumi Children

References

External links　
 Official website in Japanese.

Members of the House of Representatives (Japan)
Female members of the House of Representatives (Japan)
Takushoku University alumni
People from Ōita Prefecture
Living people
1946 births
Koizumi Children
Liberal Democratic Party (Japan) politicians
21st-century Japanese women politicians
Beppu University alumni